Russula albida is a fungus said to be edible. It is found in North America under deciduous trees.

See also
List of Russula species

External links
Russula species description

albida
Fungi of North America